|}

The Queensferry Stakes is a Listed flat horse race in Great Britain open to horses aged three years or older.
It is run at Chester over a distance of 6 furlongs and 17 yards (1,223 metres), and it is scheduled to take place each year in late July or early August.

The race was first run in 1998.

Records
Most successful horse (2 wins):
 Vita Spericolata - 2001, 2002
 Green Manalishi - 2007, 2008
 Kimberella - 2017, 2018
 Judicial - 2020, 2021

Leading jockey (4 wins):
Paul Hanagan – Green Manalishi (2008), Masamah (2010), Kimberella (2017, 2018)

Leading trainer (4 wins):
Kevin Ryan – Green Manalishi (2007, 2008), Masamah (2010), Major Jumbo (2019)

Winners

See also
 Horse racing in Great Britain
 List of British flat horse races

References 
Racing Post: 

Flat races in Great Britain
Chester Racecourse
Open sprint category horse races
Recurring sporting events established in 1998
1998 establishments in England